The Sırımtaş Dam is a gravity dam and one of the 22 dams of the Southeastern Anatolia Project. It is located on the Birimşe River near the town of Alancık in Adıyaman Province, Turkey. The primary purpose of the dam is hydroelectric power production and its power station has a 28 MW installed capacity.

References

Dams in Adıyaman Province
Hydroelectric power stations in Turkey
Dams completed in 2013
Southeastern Anatolia Project
Gravity dams
Dams in the Euphrates River basin
Roller-compacted concrete dams